Cayres is a commune in the Haute-Loire department and Auvergne-Rhône-Alpes region of southeast central France.

Population

See also
 Communes of the Haute-Loire department
 Lac du Bouchet

References

Communes of Haute-Loire